Tonga may refer to five different languages:
Tongan language, or Tonga (ISO 639-3: ton) – a Polynesian language spoken in Tonga in the South Pacific
Tonga language (Zambia and Zimbabwe), or Chitonga (ISO 639-3: toi) – a Bantu language spoken in Zambia, Zimbabwe and Mozambique
Tonga language (Malawi), or Chitonga (ISO 639-3: tog) – a Bantu language spoken in Malawi
Tonga language (Mozambique), or Gitonga (ISO 639-3: toh) – a Bantu language spoken in Mozambique
Ten'edn, also known as Tonga or Mos (ISO 639-3: tnz) – a Mon-Khmer language spoken in Thailand and Malaysia